Nordic Choice Hotels (until December 2010 known as Choice Hotels Scandinavia) is one of the largest hotel companies in Scandinavia with 200 hotels in Scandinavia, Finland and the Baltics and over 16,500 employees.

The Norwegian company is 100% owned by Petter Stordalen through his company Strawberry Group. In 2006 Torgeir Silseth became CEO for the Nordic Choice Hotels Group.

Nordic Choice Hotels is a franchisee of Choice Hotels International. The franchise agreement gives the company the right to use three brands and their umbrella brands. Apart from that, Nordic Choice Hotels is in most aspects run independently from Choice International.

Brands

The hotels are marketed under four brands:
 Clarion Hotel are in city centres and airports. The 28 hotels under the Clarion Hotel brand are located in Sweden, Norway, Finland and Denmark. 
 Clarion Collection Hotel is a sub-brand by Nordic Choice Hotels. Clarion Collection Hotels are centrally located and have a feel-like-home concept based on the Scandinavian word "hygge". Clarion Collection Hotel is present in Norway and Sweden. 
 Quality Hotel is one of the largest hotel chains in the Nordics with over 60 hotels in Norway, Sweden and Denmark. 
 Comfort Hotel has about 30 hotels in Norway, Sweden, Denmark and Lithuania and markets itself as an urban and "easy on the wallet" alternative.
 Nordic Hotels & Resorts 37 hotels:
 Sweden: Hotel At Six, Hobo, Nordic Light Hotel, Hotel C Stockholm, Aronsborg Konferenshotellet, Selma Spa+, Copperhill Mountain Lodge, Strömstad Spa, Stenungsbaden Yacht Club, Avalon Hotel, Vox Hotel, Ice Hotel Jukkasjärvi and Frösö Park.
 Norway: The Thief, Hotel Christiania Teater, Farris Bad, Hotel Oleana, Hotel No13, Hotel Brosundet, Norefjell Ski & Spa, Son Spa, Funken Lodge and Amerikalinjen.
 Denmark: Hotel Skt. Petri and Villa Copenhagen.
 Finland: Hotel Kämp, Hotel St. George, Klaus K Hotel, Hotel Haven, Hotel Fabian, Hotel Lilla Roberts, GLO Hotel Kluuvi, GLO Hotel Art, GLO Hotel Airport, GLO Hotel Sello and Hotel F6.

History 
Nordic Choice Hotels was established in Norway 1990 as Choice Hotels Scandinavia. During 1994 the company signed a franchise agreement with Choice Hotels International that gave them the right to market its hotels as Comfort, Clarion and Quality hotels. The company was listed at the Oslo stock exchange in 1997, but was lifted in 2005 when Home Invest (owned by business man Petter Stordalen) bought 100% of the stock.

In 2021, the chain adopted ChromeOS on its computers company-wide in response to a ransomware attack.

References

Hotel chains
Hospitality companies established in 1990
Hospitality companies of Norway
 
Companies based in Oslo
Norwegian companies established in 1990